San Antonio is a district of the Nicoya canton, in the Guanacaste province of Costa Rica.

Geography 
San Antonio has an area of  km² and an elevation of  metres.

Locations
Barrios: Guayabal
Poblados: Biscoyol, Bolsa, Boquete, Buenos Aires, Cañal, Carao, Cerro Mesas, Conchal, Corral de Piedra, Corralillo, Coyolar, Cuba, Cuesta Madroño, Chira, Flor, Florida, Guayabo, Loma Ayote, Matamba, México, Montañita, Monte Galán, Moracia, Ojo de Agua, Palos Negros, Piave, Piedras Blancas, Pozas, Pozo de Agua, Pueblo Nuevo, Puerto Humo, Rosario, San Lázaro, San Vicente, Silencio, Talolinga, Tamarindo, Zapote

Demographics 

For the 2011 census, San Antonio had a population of  inhabitants.

Transportation

Road transportation 
The district is covered by the following road routes:
 National Route 150
 National Route 905
 National Route 906
 National Route 907
 National Route 920
 National Route 929
 National Route 931

References 

Districts of Guanacaste Province
Populated places in Guanacaste Province